Jack Sperling (August 17, 1922 – February 26, 2004) was an American jazz drummer who performed as a sideman in big bands and as a studio musician for pop and jazz acts, movies, and television.

Career
In 1941 he played with trumpeter Bunny Berigan. After World War II, he and Henry Mancini joined the Glenn Miller band when it was led by Tex Beneke. Sperling drew attention with his performance on the song St. Louis Blues (1948). He then joined Les Brown and His Band of Renown, which played regularly for the Bob Hope radio program. Sperling and other members of Brown's band joined Dave Pell's octet in 1953. He recorded with octet on Plays Irving Berlin (1953) and on The Original Reunion of the Glenn Miller Orchestra  (1954). From 1954–57, he was a member of Bob Crosby's Bobcats. During the rest of his career, he worked in bands led by Charlie Barnet, Page Cavanaugh,  Pete Fountain, and Benny Goodman.

Sperling was among the studio musicians who accompanied Henry Mancini on the television show Peter Gunn. He recorded with Mancini on the film soundtracks Charade (1963) and Days of Wine and Roses (1962). Sperling was the featured solo drummer on the theme song for the TV show Hogan's Heroes. From 1959–1972, he was under contract with the NBC Orchestra. This meant working for The Tonight Show Band, Rowan & Martin's Laugh-In, and TV variety shows hosted by Bob Hope, Dean Martin, and Andy Williams.

In the music world, he recorded with Rosemary Clooney, Bobby Darin, Sammy Davis Jr., Doris Day, Ella Fitzgerald, The Four Freshmen, Lena Horne, Peggy Lee, Elvis Presley, Frank Sinatra, and Mel Tormé.

Discography
With Bunny Berigan
 Bunny Berigan Orchestra 1938–1942 (RCA)
 Sophisticated Swing (1947)

With Tex Beneke and the Glenn Miller Orchestra
 St. Louise Blues March (RCA, 1948)
 Cherokee Canyon (RCA Victor, 1948)
 Palladium Patrol (1970)
 Dancers Delight (1996)
 Live at the Edgewater (2000)
 Tex Beneke & His Orchestra 1946–1949
 In Glenn Millers' Footsteps: Blues Serenades & Marches (2001)
 Five Minutes More: A Tribute (2001)
 It's Magic 1947–48 (2002)
 Memories (2005)
 Gary Steven's Sings (2005)
 Midnight Serenade (2006)
 Beyond the Sea (2007)

With Les Brown
 Connee Boswell and Les Brown (1950) Short Film (15 min.)
 Connee Boswell I Don't Know (1950)
 Connie Boswell Martha (1950)
 Over the Rainbow (1951)
 My Heart Belongs to Daddy (Coral, 1952) 
 Back in Your Own Backyard (Coral, 1952) 
 Palladium Concert (1953)
 Live at the Hollywood Palladium (1954)
 Les Brown & His Orchestra, Vol. 2 (1949)
 Blue Moon, Vol. 1 Blue Moon
 Blue Skies, Vol. 2 Blue Moon
 Perdido, Vol. 3 Blue Moon
 Radio Days Live(2001)
 Les Brown & His Band Renown (Coral, 1957) 
 Swinging Song Book (Coral, 1957) 
 Live at Elitch Gardens 1959 (1959)
 Bandland/ Revolution In Sound (1960)
 Digital Swing (1986)
 Anything Goes (1994)
 America Swings (1995)
 Sentimental Thing (with Bing Crosby & Billy Eckstine) (2003)
 No Name Bop
 A Good Man Is Hard to Find
 Thank You for Your Fine Attention
 The Les Brown All-Stars (2006)

With Doris Day
 From This Moment On (Columbia, 1950)
 It's Magic (2002)

With The Modernaires
 St. Louise Blues March (1948) RCA Victor
 Like Swung (1959) Mercury

With Dave Pell
 Plays Irving Berlin (1953) Capitol
 Burke and Van Heusen (1953) Capitol
 I Had the Craziest Dream (1955) Capitol
 Say It with Music (2004)
 Jazz for Dancing and Listening

With Tom Talbert Jazz Orchestra
 The Warm Cafe (1955) (1991)
 Duke's Domain (1955) (1993)

With Scatman Crothers
 Oh, Yeah! (Tops, 1956)
 Rock and Roll with Scat Man (1956)

With John Towner
 Jazz Beginnings-Fresh Sound (1956)

With Rosemary Clooney
 Jazz Singer (1952)
 Many a Wonderful Moment (RCA, 1958)

With Ella Fitzgerald
 Get Happy! (1957)
 The Secret of Christmas (1959)
 The Christmas Song (1959)

With Pete Fountain
 Pete Fountain's New Orleans (Coral, 1959) 
 Pete Fountain Day (Coral, 1960) 
 Pete Fountain Salutes The Great Clarinetists (Coral, 1960) 
 Pete Fountain's French Quarter (Coral, 1961) 
 Live in Santa Monica (1961)
 Jack Sperling and his Fascinatin' Rhythm (Coral, 1961) 
 Plenty of Pete (Coral, 1963) 
 Mr. New Orleans (MCA, 1963)

With Henry Mancini
 Fallout/Music from Peter Gunn (RCA, 1959) 
 The Blues and the Beat (RCA, 1960) 
 Cheers (RCA, 1962) 
 Uniquely Mancini (RCA, 1963) 
 Mancini '67 (The Big Band Sound of Henry Mancini) (RCA, 1967) 
 Mancini Salutes Sousa (RCA, 1972) 
 Martinis with Mancini (RCA, 1998)

With Frank Sinatra
 Guys and Dolls (Reprise, 1963) 
 We Open in Venice (1963)

With Dean Martin
 Bianca (Reprise, 1963) 
 If This Isn't Love (Reprise, 1963) 
 Everybody Loves Somebody Sometime (Capitol, 1964)

With Bobby Darin
 From Hello Dolly to Goodbye Charlie (Capitol, 1964) 
 Broadway Bag (Atlantic, 1965) 
 Magic of Bobby Darin (Atlantic, 1965) 
 The Shadow of Your Smile (Atlantic, 1965) 
 "Breaking Point"/"Silver Dollar" (Atlantic, 1966) (singles) 
 Swingin' the Standards (Atlantic, 1999)

With Bud Freedman
 Tender Loving World (1973)
 When It's Time to Tell (1973)
 That's Love (1973)
 How Could I Go On (1973)
 Sleepy Baby (1973)

With Abe Most
 Abe Most Live! (1994)
 I Love Yo Much Too Much (2007)

With Paul Cacia
 Paul & His New Age Jazz Orchestra (2003)
 Cacia: Portrait (2003)

With others
 Elvis Presley Elvis 1968
 Dinah Washington The Definitive Dianah Washington 1943–1962
 Teresa Brewer Music, Music, Music (1950)
 Billy May Glenn Miller Orchestra Reunion (1954)
 Walter Gross Walter Gross Plays His Own Great Songs (1956)
 George Van Eps Mellow Guitar (1956)
 Freddie Slack Boogie-Woogie on the 88 (1956)
 Jo Stafford & Paul Weston The Original Piano Artistry of Jonathan Edwards, Vocals by Darlene Edwards (1957)
 The Kirby Stone Four Man I Flipped (1957)
 The Four Freshmen The Four Freshmen and 5 Guitars (Capitol, 1957) 
 Harry Belafonte Harry Belafonte Sings the Blues (RCA, 1958) 
 Sheb Wooley The Purple People Eater (RCA, 1958) 
 The Kingston Trio Here We Go Again (Capitol, 1959) 
 Chet Atkins Chet Atkins in Hollywood (RCA, 1959) 
 Ralph Marterie and the All Star Men Big Band Man (Mercury, 1959) 
 Paul Smith Saratoga (1959)
 Benny Goodman King of Swing 1958–1967 (1960, 1995)
 Page Cavanaugh Quartet (1960)
 Page Cavanaugh Septet (1961)
 Sue Raney Breathless
 Wynona Carr Wild Wonderful Wynona (1962)
 James Brown Mr. James Brown Getting Down to It (1966)
 Bonanza A Ponderosa Party (1962–1966)
 Godfrey Hirsch Happiness is Godfrey Hirsch and His Vibes(1966)
 Bob Crosby Mardi Gras Parade (1966)
 Charlie Barnet Charlie Barnet Big Band: 1967 (1966)
 Carmen McRae Portrait of Carmen (1967)
 Bob Florence Pet Project (1967)
 John Sheridan Stairway to Paradise (1975)
 Peanuts Hucko Peanuts Hucko with His Pied Piper Quintet (1979)
 Don Fagerquist Portrait of a Great Jazz Artist

Soundtracks
 The Five Pennies (Paramount, 1959) 
 Peter Gunn (MGM, 1959) 
 Mr. Lucky (CBS, 1959) 
 Rawhide (Paramount, 1959) 
 Days of Wine and Roses (Warner Bros., 1962) 
 Hatari (Paramount, 1962) 
 Bonanza (Paramount, 1962) 
 Charade (Universal, 1963) 
 Bewitched(Screen Gems, 1964) 
 Hogan's Heroes (Paramount, 1965) 
 Elvis (1968)

Early musical short films
  Les Brown (1948)
  Les Brown and His Band of Renown (1949)
  Art Lund-Tex Beneke-Les Brown  (1948)
  Connee Boswell and Les Brown's Orchestra (1950)
  Crazy Frolic (1953)
  Dance Demons (1957)
  Rockabilly Baby (1957)
  Snarder Telescriptions: The Big Bands Vol. 2 (1958)

Television
 Bob Hope Show(1949–1954) NBC Radio
 Colgate Comedy Hour (1952) NBC
 The Bob Crosby Show (1954–57) CBS
 Peter Gunn (1958–1961) MGM
 Mr. Lucky (1959–1960) CBS
 Rawhide (1959) Paramount
 The Tonight Show Starring Johnny Carson
 Bob Hope Show (1959–1962) NBC
 The Steve Allen Show (1959) NBC
 Bobby Darin and Friends (1961) NBC
 Andy Williams Show (1962–1967) NBC
 Bonanza (1962–1966) Paramount
 Star Time: The Swingin' Singin' Years (1960) NBC
 Bewitched (1964) Screen Gems
 Bob Hope Thanksgiving Show (1964) NBC
 Hogan's Heroes (1965) Paramount
 Dean Martin Show (1965–1972) NBC
 Dean Martin Summer Show (1966) NBC
 Movin' With Nancy (1967) NBC
 Rowan & Martin's Laugh-In(1968–1972) NBC
 Rowan & Martin at the Movies (1968) NBC
 Dean Martin and The Golddigger's (1968) NBC
 Elvis (NBC-TV Special) (1968) NBC

References

External links
 Glenn Miller Memorials
 Jack Sperling recordings at the Discography of American Historical Recordings.

1922 births
2004 deaths
American session musicians
American jazz drummers
Big band drummers
Swing drummers
Dixieland drummers
Jazz musicians from New Orleans
20th-century American drummers
American male drummers
20th-century American male musicians
American male jazz musicians
The Tonight Show Band members